Robert Esmond McMaster (15 January 1921 – 1 August 2003), also known by the nickname of "Wallaby Bob", was an Australian wrestler, rugby union and professional rugby league footballer. He played in the 1940s and 1950s, and was a wrestling referee in the 1960s and 1970s.

Background
McMaster was born in Rockhampton, Queensland, Australia, he was a pupil at Kelvin Grove State School, and then at St Joseph's College, Gregory Terrace, he retired from participative sport in the late 1950s to become the owner of the Wallaby Hotel at Mudgeeraba, Gold Coast hinterland,  he sold the hotel in 1979 and retired to Tallai, Queensland to concentrate on trotting, the horses were sold off in the early 1990s, he suffered a heart attack while attending a presentation ceremony by the Australian Rugby Union at the Brisbane Convention & Exhibition Centre, and he died aged 82 in Brisbane, Australia.

International honours
Bob McMaster won caps for Australia (RU) while at Brothers Old Boys in 1946 against New Zealand, New Zealand Māori, and New Zealand, in 1947 against New Zealand (two matches), and on the 1947–48 Australia rugby union tour of Britain, Ireland, France and North America in 1947 against Ireland, and Wales, represented British Empire (RL) while at Leeds in 1949 against France, and won caps for Other Nationalities (RL) while at Leeds in 1949 against England, Wales, in 1950 against France (two matches), in 1951 against France, and in 1952 against England.

Wrestling
Bob McMaster made his début as a professional wrestler in London during 1949, he was trained in Australia by former wrestler Samuel Burmister, he toured South Africa in mid-1956, and later became a referee for World Championship Wrestling (Australia).

Genealogical information
Bob McMaster was married (1948–61) to Joyce May (née Hamilton, (–January 2019), and married (1966–) the dancer Dawn Butler. He was the father of Jim McMaster, the comedian and impressionist Danny McMaster, and the grandfather (Danny McMaster's son) of the  association football (soccer) player Griffin McMaster.

References

External links
(archived by web.archive.org) Profile at braveandgame.com.au
Profile at obsessedwithwrestling.com

1921 births
2003 deaths
Australian rugby league players
Australian rugby union players
Australia international rugby union players
Australian male professional wrestlers
British Empire rugby league team players
Brothers Old Boys players
Leeds Rhinos players
Other Nationalities rugby league team players
Past Brothers players
Professional wrestling referees
Rugby league players from Rockhampton, Queensland
Rugby league props
Rugby union players from Queensland
Rugby union props
Sportspeople from Rockhampton